This is a list of Bangladeshi films that were released in 2005.

Releases

See also

2005 in Bangladesh
List of Bangladeshi films
Cinema of Bangladesh

References

Film
Bangladesh
 2005